The Overlander was a long-distance rail passenger train between Auckland and Wellington in the North Island of New Zealand, along the North Island Main Trunk (NIMT). It was operated by Tranz Scenic. The service was replaced from 25 June 2012, by the Northern Explorer.

The Overlander replaced a previous service operated by RM class Silver Fern railcars on Monday 2 December 1991. Following the withdrawal of the overnight Northerner, it was the only regular passenger train on the NIMT between Pukekohe and Palmerston North. After being threatened with cessation itself in 2006, it gained significantly in popularity, partly because of increased tourism promotion for the service.

It was called one of the best-value scenic rail trips in the world by the British Guardian. It is also acknowledged as one of the world's classic scenic rail journeys.

Route

History

Origins
The first regular daylight Wellington-Auckland passenger train services, augmenting the older overnight services, were the steam-hauled Daylight Limited and diesel-hauled Scenic Daylight that ran primarily during summer months and Easter holiday period for many years from the 1920s onwards. The arrival of the Blue Streak and later Silver Fern railcars saw an end for a time to regular carriage trains, except when the Silver Fern railcars were replaced by carriage trains.

Proposed cessation
On 25 July 2006, it was announced that the service would be withdrawn at the end of September as it had made a loss for some time. The last trains were scheduled to run on Saturday 30 September 2006.

On 18 August 2006, the Green Party announced a Save the Overlander campaign, which received a positive response, primarily from the small towns along the train's route.

On 28 September 2006, three days before the service was due to end, Toll announced that it would continue on a schedule reduced from daily year-round to Fridays, Saturdays, and Sundays in the off-peak winter season, and daily in the peak summer and Easter period.

New life

 
The Overlander's reprieve saw an interim refurbishment programme implemented, both internally and externally. Externally, the three former Bay Express cars and seven existing Overlander cars retained the Cato blue paint scheme of the Tranz Rail era, but with the new "Overlander" promotional logo introduced by Toll Rail on the sides in large white letters. Also, structural repair work was carried out. Internally, the cars were tidied up and seats replaced or reupholstered in some cars, new carpet laid in others.

In 2008, the train was again close to capacity in usage of its just over 160 seats, and it was mooted that daily services be reestablished. After the New Zealand government re-purchased the rail services in 2008 and renamed them KiwiRail, a rail upgrade budget was also announced that included funds for refurbishing the trains.

In mid-2009, it was announced that patronage had steadily increased and that the service was thriving with 25.5% more passengers over the previous year, and that additional carriages had been added to the train in some cases to satisfy demand. KiwiRail also announced that as a result, services would be extended to daily during the July school holidays, and the general peak season timetable extended to more than seven months each year. The service then became seven days a week from September through to May, with the winter off peak May to September being Friday, Saturday and Sunday.

Due to increased interest and passenger demand, the town of Taihape was reinstated in October 2009 as a stop on the Overlander, following the local "Stop the Train" co-operative petition, headed by the Taihape Community Development Trust, Taihape Community Board, and the Older and Bolder Groups. Today with the Northern Explorer service, Taihape is no longer a stop.

Re-branding as the Northern Explorer 

In 2012, passenger numbers were again in decline. KiwiRail decided to replace the Overlander with a new service, the Northern Explorer, from Monday, 25 June 2012.

Rolling stock

The Overlander was usually hauled by DC or EF locomotives with NZR 56-foot carriages.

Originally the service was operated with six Northerner cars (originally single lavatory first class cars, later designated South Island Main Trunk first class cars, refurbished for the original Southerner Expresses of 1970), the Bay Express servery/observation/rear-view car, and what was once both The Connoisseur car and TranzAlpine rear-view/observation car and the two Northerner modular handbrake end-mounted 11 kW generator FM -class power-luggage vans, painted in the dark blue InterCity logo with a 220 mm white stripe sandwiching a 100 mm red band, minus the parcels traffic. 
In December 1991 another modular van was refitted with a generator, and a Wairarapa Connection car with 32 seats to a newer design arranged alcove-style and a servery to facilitate the introduction of a third trainset for maintenance requirements, the third set thus becoming a spare.

Extra Carriages

The former Vice-Regal (Governor-General) car turned Southerner full buffet car was refitted in 1993 and returned to the NIMT with 24 seats to a newer design arranged alcove style and a short buffet counter to replace the full-length counter and 20 bar stools.

A new "no-frills" fare was introduced, using the remaining six Northerner carriages, a Southerner carriage and two Auckland excursion carriages between 1995 and 2002. With the cancellation of the Bay Express in 2001, the three panorama carriages from that train were utilised as a fourth set for the NIMT.

Re-equipping

From December 1991 to December 1994, nine ex second class passenger coaches built between 1937 and 1945 (one the former TranzAlpine rear-view observation car, one a Southerner car, two from Auckland excursion, three from Auckland suburban and two from Wairarapa commuter services) were extensively refurbished similar to the successful "big window" panorama cars used on the TranzAlpine, Coastal Pacific and pressure-ventilated Bay Express cars and made into three 3-car/1-van sets for "new" Overlander/Northerner services, each including a coach with a servery bar where hot food, snacks and beverages can be bought during the trip, a rear view observation car and a 49-seat day car. All nine cars were fully air-conditioned.

Vans

Three modular vans, one from the Telecom train, one from the Sesqui 1990 and one from the Bay Express trains were refitted to newer designs, all incorporating new-style 90 kW generators for increased on-train requirements, as power-luggage vans. An Auckland suburban van, the other of two Bay Express vans and the second of two Northerner vans were similarly refitted to serve this train.

Double duty
As the Overlander and Northerner shared rolling stock, substantially better carriage utilisation was achieved, compared to having two train sets sitting unused for over 12 hours a day.

On Wednesday 16 August 2006, the first air-conditioned 42-seat rear-view Northerner/Overlander car and its air-conditioned 49-seat day car running mate, were taken to Hutt Workshops and stored, their bogies went under the ex-British Rail cars for the Wairarapa Connection.

Former passenger stops

References

External links

 18 August 2006: Greens put "Save the Overlander" campaign on the rails

Long-distance passenger trains in New Zealand
Railway services introduced in 1991
Railway services discontinued in 2012
1991 establishments in New Zealand
2012 disestablishments in New Zealand
Named passenger trains of New Zealand
Discontinued railway services in New Zealand

de:Overlander